Kardeh (also Romanized as Kārdeh; also known as Chahār Deh) is a village in Kardeh Rural District, in the Central District of Mashhad County, Razavi Khorasan Province, Iran. At the 2006 census, its population was 351, in 88 families.

References 

Populated places in Mashhad County